Mahalingam is a surname. Notable people with the name include:
N. Mahalingam (1923–2014), Businessman, educationalist and philanthropist
P. Mahalingam, Indian politician
S. Mahalingam (engineer) (1926–2015), Sri Lankan Tamil mechanical engineer and academic
S. Mahalingam (veterinarian), Sri Lankan academic and veterinarian
Sathyan Mahalingam, Indian playback singer and composer known as Sathyan
T. R. Mahalingam (actor) (1923–78), Tamil film actor, singer and music composer 
T. R. Mahalingam (flautist) (1926–86), Flautist 
T. V. Mahalingam (c.1907–83), Indian historian
V. S. Mahalingam Scientist and expert on Artificial Intelligence and robotics

See also
Anjalai Ammal Mahalingam Engineering College (AAMEC), college in Thiruvarur District, Tamil Nadu, India